Santa Maria de Jetibá is the name of a municipality in central Espírito Santo, Southeastern Brazil. It was founded in 1857 by Pomeranian immigrants who arrived through the state capital Vitória by going up the river Santa Maria.

Geography
Located in the south-central mountain region of Espírito Santo, this municipality has an area of 735.55 square kilometers. The town of Santa Maria de Jetibá is 720 meters above sea level, and the highest point in the state is Garrafão Peak, at 1200 meters (3937 ft) above sea level.

People
With a total population of 41,015 (2020), Santa Maria de Jetibá is considered one of the last significant East Pomeranian-speaking communities in the world. Those immigrants (Pomeranians), who came from the historical region Pomerania, now part of Germany and Poland where it is known as Pommern and Pomorze respectively.

In Brazil, many Pomeranians also established communities in Santa Catarina (see Pomerode) and Rio Grande do Sul (see Arroio do Padre). Santa Maria de Jetibá is a place where the people still speak solely East Pomeranian in their day-to-day life. Due to the isolation of this community, most of the members of the community live in very poor conditions. Due also to financial constraints by the state, very little investment in education is forthcoming, and the language barrier persists to be a real problem for the community. This also hinders their future prospects, of course, by them not having proper education, thus a reasonable expectation in the work market. Those communities are mainly rural.

Demography
Most of the population of that city is descended from Pomeranian and German peoples.
 East Pomeranian, a dialect of Low German, has co-official status in Santa Maria de Jetibá.

Source: 2010 Census

Climate

Santa Maria de Jetibá is on a high valley and the altitude of this Town is about 700m above the sea level. The elevation of this municipality influences the climate. It features a cool and dry climate in winter, while there are wet and hot days with cool nights in summer. Santa Maria de Jetibá features a humid subtropical climate type Cwa.

See also
Low German language

References

External links

Municipalities in Espírito Santo
1857 establishments in Brazil